The Psychological Organization for the Promotion of Mental Health (POPMH) is an organization of the psychology societies and/or organizations of different universities and colleges in the Batangas province as well as in Laguna initiated by the Philippine Mental Health Association Lipa-Batangas Chapter. It is under the Education & Information Services of the Philippine Mental Health Association - Lipa Batangas Chapter (PMHA-Lipa Batangas Chapter) under the Youth Life Enrichment Program whereas it is advocating mental health through conferences, seminar-workshops, and school-based mental health clubs. It also aims to train the youth to become crusaders of mental health, by helping them become aware of themselves, their environment and social issues pertinent to mental health.

Member Colleges and Universities

The POPMH is composed of the following member schools with degree in psychology:

POPMH Batangas

 Batangas State University – Gov. Pablo Borbon Campus I (Batangas City)
 Batangas State University – Claro M. Recto Campus (Lipa City)
 Batangas State University - Jose P. Laurel Polytechnic College Campus (Malvar)
 Batangas State University - Apolinario R. Apacible School of Fisheries Campus (Nasugbu)
 De La Salle Lipa (Lipa City)
 DMMC Institute of Health Sciences
 First Asia Institute of Technology and Humanities (Tanauan City)
 Lipa City Colleges (Lipa City)
 Lyceum of the Philippines University Batangas (Batangas City)
 Polytechnic University of the Philippines - Santo Tomas
 Sta. Teresa College - Bauan, Batangas
 University of Batangas (Batangas City)
 University of Batangas - Lipa Campus (Lipa City)

POPMH Laguna

 Colegio de San Juan de Letran-Calamba 
 Laguna College of Business and Arts 
 Laguna State Polytechnic University
 Lyceum of the Philippines University-Laguna
 San Pablo Colleges
 San Sebastian College - Recoletos, Canlubang
 University of Perpetual Help System DALTA - Calamba
 Dalubhasaan ng Lungsod ng San Pablo

References

Mental health in the Philippines
Organizations based in Batangas